The 2015 season for the  cycling team began in January at the Trofeo Santanyi–Ses Salines-Campos. The team participated in UCI Continental Circuits and UCI World Tour events when given a wildcard invitation.

On the first rest day of the 2014 Tour de France, 15 July 2014, the team announced they had secured sponsorship with German cooking surface and extractor manufacturer BORA. The team for 2015 onwards will thus be known as Team BORA. The team will be the first German team with a German title sponsor in the professional peloton since 2010. Team manager Ralph Denk expressed hope that BORA's backing would help the team achieve their aim of joining the UCI World Tour by 2017.
After the end of the 2014 Tour de France, it was announced that starting in 2015 the team would ride bicycles from Canadian company, Argon 18, which would also be the team's second title sponsor.

2015 roster

Riders who joined the team for the 2015 season

Riders who left the team during or after the 2014 season

Season victories

National, Continental and World champions 2015

Footnotes

References

External links
 

2015 road cycling season by team
2015
2015 in German sport